Jo Ann McIntosh Zimmerman (December 24, 1936 – October 22, 2019) was an American politician who served as the 42nd Lieutenant Governor of Iowa from 1987 to 1991. A member of the Democratic Party, she was the first woman to serve in the office of lieutenant governor in Iowa history.

Early life
Zimmerman was born on December 24, 1936, to Russell and Hazel McIntosh, in Van Buren County, Iowa as the eldest of three children. She graduated from Keosauqua High School. Zimmerman graduated from Drake University and studied at Iowa State University. Zimmerman was a nurse and raised cattle on her family's farm.

In 1956, she married Tom Zimmerman, and had five children.

Political career

In 1982, Zimmerman won election to the Iowa House of Representatives where she advocated various health issues, and won the 1986 election for Lieutenant Governor of Iowa, separately from Governor Terry Branstad. As Lt. Governor, Zimmerman advocated for the elimination of her own office (as it was considered a figurehead position) and championed other progressive causes in her position. Zimmerman briefly entered the 1990 gubernatorial election to unseat incumbent governor Branstad, but dropped out to run on the Iowa Democratic Party ticket as Lt. Governor with Donald Avenson (who subsequently lost to Branstad). She left office in 1991.

Death 
Zimmerman died of complications of pulmonary fibrosis on October 22, 2019, at the age of 82. She had been suffering from the disease for about 8 years previously.

See also
List of female lieutenant governors in the United States

References

External links

Lieutenant Governors of Iowa
Women state legislators in Iowa
Democratic Party members of the Iowa House of Representatives
Presidents of the Iowa Senate
Democratic Party Iowa state senators
1936 births
2019 deaths
People from Van Buren County, Iowa
American nurses
American women nurses
Farmers from Iowa
Drake University alumni
Iowa State University alumni
Deaths from pulmonary fibrosis
21st-century American women